Charles Enebeli (born 23 October 1986), better known by his stage name D'Prince, is a Nigerian Afropop recording artist, record executive and entrepreneur. He is the founder and the CEO of Jonzing World, an entertainment company he founded in 2019.

Early life 
Charles Enebeli was born in Lagos on 23 October 1986. He was born to Collins Enebeli, a businessman and a musical production manager and founder of the record label Sagitarious Productions, and Patience Enebeli, an international Business tycoon. D'Prince is the younger brother of music mogul and CEO of Mavin Records, Don Jazzy.
Music has always been in this family and he is not strange to the Music business. D'Prince is also known as "Omoba", which means a "Child of a King" in Yoruba language.

D'Prince attended King's College, Lagos for his secondary level education and then decided to follow his passion in music.

Career 
As a tribute to his mentor Fela and Bob Marley, D'Prince uses a fusion of Afrobeat and Afropop to bring his music to life in honor of his mentors. His songs are based on fact & life, with a deeper meaning which documents the struggle of a young Nigerian trying to achieve his dreams. He performs in Igbo, English and Pidgin English.

2005–2012:Mo' Hits records, & breakthrough single "Omoba" 
D'Prince was asked to be a part of the Mo' Hits Records in 2005 after his elder brother Don Jazzy came back from the UK to promote the record label in Nigeria. Ever since he joined Mo' Hits Records in 2005 he has been behind the scenes working on his personal album Frenzy which released under the record label in 2012.

D'Prince has recorded many songs for Mo' Hits Records and also the Mo' Hits Records compilation album Curriculum Vitae which was released in December 2007. It included hit singles, "Booty Call", "Close To You", "Masquerade", "Stop The Violence", "Igbe Mi", "Hey Girl", "What You Want To Do To Me", "Oh No", which was the lead single. On 25 November 2009, D'Prince released his single titled "Omoba" and was relaunched in 2010. On 13 April 2010 the official Video of the song "Omoba" was released. through Mo' Hits Records.

2012-2019:Mavin Records, Frenzy, O.Y.O, Bestie, & Gucci Gang 
D'Prince moved to Mavin Records after the dissolution of Mo' Hits Records in 2012. On 31 October 2012, he released three singles "Goody Bag", "Call The Police", and "Real G" featuring M.I Abaga off his debut studio album Frenzy. On 5 November 2012, he released his "1st" studio album Frenzy. The album features Wande Coal, Don Jazzy, Dr SID, Wizkid, Timaya, M.I Abaga, Tiwa Savage, Bracket, Sinzu (fka Sauce Kid), Eva Alordiah, General Pype, and Ice Prince. The deluxe version was released on Truspot. His studio album was exclusively produced by his brother Don Jazzy, with the likes of BabyFresh, Burssbrain (fka Altims), Aone Beats, Spellz and Joshbeatz. On 8 May 2012, Mavin released its first compilation album Solar Plexus, featuring D'Prince, among others. He recorded "Take Banana" and "Amarachi" sololy on the album, which became a major hit.

In 2014, he released "OYO (On Your Own)", a wake-up call to the nation to fight for themselves. The record was produced by Don Jazzy, with voiceover record from him, saying "Hey my men, now is not the time, it's the time to sit back and think about your life". According to music critic Chinwe Okafor of YNaija, the record is probably the best thing he has done in a while. Chinwe Okafor described the song as a modern-day Fela vibe, rating the song 3.5 out of 5, and passing the song with A for its effort, and acting skill, saying, "The video basically describes the lackadaisical beings in the country." On 30 November, the visual of O.Y.O was released and shot in Lagos by Clarence Peters.

On 3 August 2015, he released Bestie, featuring Don Jazzy, and Babyfresh, who also played a major role as producers of the song.

On 2 October 2017, he released Sade, produced by Babyfresh. Same day he released the music video of Sade, shot by Unlimited LA.

On 16 February 2018, he released Gucci Gang, produced by Don Jazzy. On 27 April 2018, he released the music video, directed by Director Q. On 28 February 2018, Rema, post a viral freestyle of Gucci Gang on Instagram, tagging him, and Don Jazzy on the post, which caught Prince attention, and secured Rema, a record deal with Jonzing World.

On 3 May 2019, he released a three track extended play, titled Lavida, and produced by Altims, and Babyfresh. The extended play also features Rema, and Don Jazzy.

Jonzing World 

On 22 March 2019, he launched his record label, and management company Jonzing World. An imprint of Mavin Records, and home to recording artists Rema, and Ruger. On 21 January 2021, Jonzing World released One Shirt, featuring Ruger, D'Prince, and Rema. Same day, Jonzing World released the visual to One Shirt, shot by Priorgold Pictures.

Endorsements 
Tele communications company MTN in 2011.
Tele communications company MTN in 2013.

Personal life

Relationships 
In 2015, D'Prince had a child with Sharon Oparacho a graduate of Coventry University, UK. In 2016 the couple welcomed their second child together.

Appearances

Discography 
Frenzy – 2012
Lavida (EP) – 2019

Singles

Collaborations

Awards and nominations

See also 

 List of Nigerian musicians

References

External links 
Twitter account
Facebook account

Living people
21st-century Nigerian male singers
Nigerian singer-songwriters
Dancehall musicians
Musicians from Umuahia
Igbo singers
King's College, Lagos alumni
1986 births